Mount Yamantau is a mountain in the Ural Mountains, located in Beloretsky District, Bashkortostan, Russia. Standing at 1,640 metres (5,381 ft) it is the highest mountain in the Southern Ural section, and is featured within the South Ural Nature Reserve.

Mt. Yamantau is notable as the subject of claims by the United States that a secret extensive bunker complex of the Russian government or Russian Armed Forces is contained within the mountain, similar to the Cheyenne Mountain Complex.

Name
The name of the mountain is derived from "Yaman Tau" (Яман тау), which translates to "evil mountain", "bad mountain", or "wicked mountain" in the local Bashkir language and the other Turkic languages of the Idel-Ural region.

Bunker complex claims
Mount Yamantau, along with Kosvinsky Mountain (600 km to the north), are claimed by the United States of being home to a large secret nuclear facility or bunker, or both. Large excavation projects have been observed by U.S. satellite imagery after the fall of the Soviet Union, as recently as the late 1990s during the government of Boris Yeltsin. During the Soviet era two military garrisons, Beloretsk-15 and Beloretsk-16, and possibly a third, Alkino-2, were built on the site. These garrisons were unified into the closed town of Mezhgorye in 1995, and the garrisons are said to house 30,000 workers each, served by large rail lines. 

Repeated U.S. questions have yielded several different responses from the Russian government regarding Yamantau, including it is a mining site, a repository for Russian treasures, a food storage area, and a bunker for leaders in case of nuclear war. Responding to questions regarding Yamantau in 1996, Russia's Defense Ministry stated: "The practice does not exist in the Defense Ministry of Russia of informing foreign mass media about facilities, whatever they are, that are under construction in the interests of strengthening the security of Russia." In 1997, a United States Congressional finding, related to the country's National Defense Authorization Act for 1998, stated that the Russian Federation kept up a "deception and denial policy" about the mountain complex after U.S. officials had given Cheyenne Mountain Complex tours to Russian diplomats, which the finding stated "... does not appear to be consistent with the lowering of strategic threats, openness, and cooperation that is the basis of the post-Cold War strategic partnership between the United States and Russia."

In popular culture 
Mount Yamantau is featured in the video game Metro Exodus where it has been taken over by cannibals.
Mount Yamatau also featured in the 2010 video game Call of Duty: Black Ops 1 where it houses a base for a fictional chemical weapon - the Nova 6.

See also
 Nuclear bunker buster
 Raven Rock Mountain Complex
 Cheyenne Mountain Complex
 Kosvinsky Kamen

References

External links
 The Return of the Doomsday Machine?

Yamantaw
Ural Mountains
Military installations of Russia
Nuclear bunkers in Europe
Secret military programs
Secret places
Strategic Rocket Forces
Yamantau